"Something He Can Feel" is a song composed by Curtis Mayfield for the 1976 motion picture Sparkle. The song, a love ballad in a Chicago-/Philly-soul style, became a number-one hit on the Billboard's R&B singles chart in the United States twice with two separate recordings: a 1976 version by Aretha Franklin from the film's soundtrack (see 1976 in music), and a 1992 cover by girl group En Vogue (see 1992 in music).

Aretha Franklin original
In the original 1976 version of the film Sparkle, the song is performed by "Sister & the Sisters", with Lonette McKee on lead vocal, and Irene Cara and Dwan Smith on backing vocals. The version of "Something He Can Feel" present on the film's soundtrack album replaces the vocal tracks with those of Aretha Franklin and the Kitty Haywood Singers, with the instrumental tracks remaining the same.

Sparkle revolves around the lives of the members of Sister & the Sisters, a 1960s Motown-esque girl group, and "Something He Can Feel" is present in the film as part of their repertoire. Franklin's recording of the song was issued as the first single from the album, and became a number-one hit on Billboard's Hot Soul Singles chart, peaking at number twenty-eight on the Billboard Hot 100, becoming Aretha's only pop Top 40 hit during the second half of the 1970s.

Sparkle would be remade in 2012, as would "Something He Can Feel", this time performed by Carmen Ejogo on lead vocal with Jordin Sparks and Tika Sumpter on backing vocals. In an allusion to Aretha Franklin's version of the song and soundtrack, Sister & Her Sisters perform "Something He Can Feel" as part of a live TV performance headlined by Franklin.

Personnel
Aretha Franklin - vocals, piano

Charts

Afrika Bambaataa feat. Boy George version
In 1988, a rap and Hip Hop artist, Afrika Bambaataa recorded a cover version of "Something He Can Feel". The cover, released on the album, The Light, a collaboration album with lead vocals on this song by Boy George.

En Vogue version

Fifteen years after Sparkle was released, American R&B group En Vogue recorded a cover version of "Something He Can Feel" (titled as "Giving Him Something He Can Feel'"), produced by Thomas McElroy and Denzil Foster. The lead vocals are sung by Dawn Robinson and the background vocals are done by Terry Ellis, Cindy Herron and Maxine Jones. The En Vogue cover, released as the second single from the group's second album, Funky Divas (1992), was also a successful hit.

The single peaked at number six on the US Billboard Hot 100 and became the fifth En Vogue single in two years to peak at number one on the Billboard Hot R&B Singles chart. In the United Kingdom, it was released as a double A-side single with "Free Your Mind" and reached number 16, while in New Zealand, it became En Vogue's highest-charting single, peaking at number two for two weeks. Nichole Cordova performed the En Vogue's version of "Something He Can Feel" on the season finale of Pussycat Dolls Present: Girlicious where she became the first member of Girlicious. She received high praise from the judges.

Critical reception
Larry Flick from Billboard complimented the song as a "lovely, retro-minded pop/R&B ballad", noting that their "remarkable trademark harmonies are always at the forefront of a musical environment that often recalls the early days of Aretha Franklin and Mary Wells." He added that the song is a "soothing interlude for all formats." Glenn Kenny from Entertainment Weekly described it as "sultry", naming it the best En Vogue song. Dave Sholin from the Gavin Report stated that here, the group "do it up stunningly, uncovering this Curtis Mayfield creation and turning it into something beyond compare." Everett True from Melody Maker said, "Effortless precision. En Vogue are the most perfectly manufactured group since Pan's People." Gerald Martinez from New Sunday Times felt the track "sees them singing low and cool, with that classic finger-snapping Motown R&B feel." Parry Gettelman from Orlando Sentinel viewed it as "exemplary", adding that the "four superb voices" of En Vogue "unleash full gospel fervor" on the song. Cheo H. Coker from Stanford Daily declared it as "fabulous", adding, "No corn, just the sounds of sultry singing matched with sparse, yet solid, instrumentation." 

Retrospective response
In an 2017 retrospective review, Quentin Harrison from Albumism remarked that the En Vogue's version restored the song to its girl group roots and brought it forward into a new decade, "reverently, but boldly." AllMusic editor Jose F. Promis declared it as a "sophisticated" and "shimmering ghetto love fable", initially popularized by Aretha Franklin. Another editor, Rob Theakston, labeled the song as a "sultry rendition". Daryl Easlea for BBC in 2009, described it as a "delicious cover". In an 2020 retrospective review, Pop Rescue stated that "whilst it’d always be hard to out-do Aretha, En Vogue are definitely worthy of a credible challenge." In 2007, Laura Checkoway from Vibe'' described the song as "alluring".

Music video
A music video was produced to promote the single, directed by Stefan Würnitzer. It begins with En Vogue putting on make-up. Then they perform for an audience of men in a club, standing on a stage in front of a blue curtain while wearing long red dresses. In the end, the men are giving a standing ovation for En Vogue. The video was later published on the group's official YouTube channel in January 2020. It has amassed more than 4,2 million views as of October 2021.

Charts

Weekly charts

Year-end charts

Certifications

See also
List of number-one R&B singles of 1976 (U.S.)
List of number-one R&B singles of 1992 (U.S.)

References

1976 singles
Curtis Mayfield songs
Aretha Franklin songs
1992 singles
En Vogue songs
Songs written by Curtis Mayfield
1976 songs
1992 songs
Atlantic Records singles
East West Records singles
Elektra Records singles
Song recordings produced by Curtis Mayfield
Rhythm and blues ballads
Soul ballads
1970s ballads